Eva Gerd Alice Cecilia Hamilton (born 29 April 1954) is a Swedish journalist who from 6 November 2006 until 2014 was the CEO for the Swedish public service television company Sveriges Television. In 2007, Hamilton was named "Sweden's most powerful woman in media" by the Veckans Affärer magazine.

References

1954 births
Living people
Swedish women business executives
Swedish journalists
Swedish television executives
Sveriges Television
20th-century Swedish women